The Battle of Châlons was fought in 274 between Roman Emperor Aurelian and Emperor Tetricus I of the Gallic Empire. Fought in what is now Châlons-en-Champagne, France, it was the battle that marked the end of the independent Gallic Empire, and its unification back to the Roman Empire, after fourteen years of separation.

Background
Aurelian, having subdued revolts in the eastern Roman Empire, began preparing to reconquer the Gallic Empire by early 274. Meanwhile, Tetricus' hold on his domain was steadily weakening, facing continuous raids from Germanic tribes and internal troubles with the rebellion of Faustinus, a provincial governor.

Tetricus ordered his troops to leave the Rhine and march southward, where they met the Roman army in the Catalunian fields of Châlons-sur-Marne.

The battle
Aurelian's army was better trained and well commanded, and when Tetricus was captured in the midst of the fighting, the Rhine army disintegrated and was torn apart by Aurelian's troops. The battle was remembered for years for its high death toll.

Aftermath
The costly battle made it much harder for Aurelian to defend the Rhine area. In the years to come, Alamans and Franks invaded the Rhineland, taking forts and destroying cities.

In the aftermath of the Battle of Châlons, Tetricus and his son were taken to Rome and paraded in a triumph. Tetricus was spared further punishment; instead, Aurelian made him a Roman administrator, a corrector Lucaniae, overseeing the region Lucania in southern Italy.

Historical controversies 
Historians dispute whether Tetricus actually wished to fight at Chalons. Various older accounts portray him as unhappy with his position as Gallic emperor. According to these, Tetricus deliberately placed his army in a disadvantageous situation, and deserted at the outset of the battle, having previously arranged the elaborate treachery with Aurelian.
However, modern historians have demurred, considering the story of Tetricus' disloyalty propaganda fomented by Aurelian. As a simple matter of logic, Aurelian might have prevented the heavy casualties to his army by having Tetricus ordinarily surrender. The empire was in desperate need of manpower to protect Gaul from the barbarian incursions, and the slaughter of Chalons left the Rhine frontier dangerously defenseless and exposed to the invasions of Franks and Alemans. 
But the narrative of Edward Gibbon appears to answer these objections: according to that historian, the Gallic army revered the memory of Postumus, and would have deposed or killed Tetricus if he tried to surrender Postumus' empire without a fight; further, Aurelian could not trust the rebellious army to submit to him permanently unless he broke its spirit with a military defeat.

Another controversy concerns the date of the battle. Although the vast majority of ancient and modern historians place it in 273, or 274, after the fall of Zenobia, Gibbon dates it before (270 or 271), on the basis of a letter from Aurelian given in the Augustan History, which implies that Firmus, suppressed in 274, was the last of the usurpers.

References

274
270s in the Roman Empire
Châlons
Gallic Empire
Chalons 274
Chalons 274
History of Marne (department)
3rd century in Roman Gaul
Aurelian